A crankcase is the housing for the crankshaft of an engine.

Crankcase can also mean:

Crankcase (G.I. Joe), a fictional character in the G.I. Joe universe
Crankcase (Transformers), a fictional character in the Transformers universe

See also